William Rutter (by 1488 – buried October 1541), of Southwark, Surrey, was an English politician.

Family
Little is known of Rutter. His wife was named Elizabeth, and her maiden name may have been Lowe. They had one son and two daughters.

Career
He was a Member (MP) of the Parliament of England for East Grinstead in 1529.

References

15th-century births
1541 deaths
People from Southwark
English MPs 1529–1536